Dragana Tomašević (born 4 June 1982, in Sremska Mitrovica) is a Serbian discus thrower. Since 8 August 2006, she is holder of the Serbian national record in Discus Throw with her personal best shot of 63.63 m.

Career
Early in her career Dragana competed in Shot Put, without any major success.

In her primary discipline, Discus Throw she competed in four Olympic Games, eight World Championships and six European Championships. Her best result in these competitions is 6th place at the 2010 and 2018 European Championships, while her best finish in World Championships is 7th place in 2005 and 2011, respectively.

On 8 August 2006, she set the Serbian national record in Discus Throw with her personal best shot of 63.63 m.

Personal bests

Achievements

See also
 Serbian records in athletics

External links
 
 
 
 
  (archive)

1982 births
Living people
Sportspeople from Sremska Mitrovica
Serbian female discus throwers
Olympic athletes of Serbia and Montenegro
Olympic athletes of Serbia
Athletes (track and field) at the 2004 Summer Olympics
Athletes (track and field) at the 2008 Summer Olympics
Athletes (track and field) at the 2012 Summer Olympics
Athletes (track and field) at the 2016 Summer Olympics
World Athletics Championships athletes for Serbia
World Athletics Championships athletes for Serbia and Montenegro
Mediterranean Games gold medalists for Serbia
Mediterranean Games silver medalists for Serbia
Mediterranean Games bronze medalists for Serbia
Athletes (track and field) at the 2005 Mediterranean Games
Athletes (track and field) at the 2009 Mediterranean Games
Athletes (track and field) at the 2013 Mediterranean Games
Universiade medalists in athletics (track and field)
Mediterranean Games medalists in athletics
Universiade bronze medalists for Serbia
Universiade bronze medalists for Serbia and Montenegro
Medalists at the 2005 Summer Universiade
Medalists at the 2007 Summer Universiade
Athletes (track and field) at the 2020 Summer Olympics